A black box theater  is a simple performance space, typically a square room with black walls and a flat floor. The simplicity of the space allows it to be used to create a variety of configurations of stage and audience interaction. The black box is a relatively recent innovation in theatre.

History 
Black box theaters have their roots in the American avant-garde of the early 20th century. The black box theaters became popular and increasingly widespread in the 1960s as rehearsal spaces.  Almost any large room can be transformed into a "black box" with the aid of paint or curtains, making black box theaters an easily accessible option for theater artists. Sets are simple and small and costs are lower, appealing to nonprofit and low-income artists or companies.  The black box is also considered by many to be a place where more "pure" theatre can be explored, with the most human and least technical elements in focus.

The concept of a building designed for flexible staging techniques can be attributed to Swiss designer Adolphe Appia, circa 1921. The invention of such a stage instigated a half-century of innovations in the relationship between audience and performers. Antonin Artaud also had ideas of a stage of this kind; the first flexible stage in America was located in the home living room of actor and manager Gilmor Brown in Pasadena, California. While the domestic decor meant that Brown's stage was not a proper black box, the idea was still a revolutionary one. This venue, and two subsequent permutations, are known as the Playbox Theatre, and functioned as an experimental space for Brown's larger venue, the Pasadena Playhouse.

Use
Such spaces are easily built and maintained. Black box theaters are usually home to plays or other performances requiring very basic technical arrangements, such as limited set construction. Common floor plans include thrust stage, modified thrust stage, and theater in the round.

Universities and other theater training programs employ the black box theater because the space is versatile and easy to change. The black backdrop can encourage the audience to focus on the actors, furthering the benefits. Many theater training programs will have both a large proscenium theater, as well as a black box theater. Not only does this allow two productions to be mounted simultaneously, but they can also have a large extravagant production in the main stage while having a small experimental show in the black box.

Black box spaces are also popular at fringe theater festivals; due to their simple design and equipment they can be used for many performances each day. This simplicity also means that a black box theater can be adapted from other spaces, such as hotel conference rooms. This is common at the Edinburgh Festival Fringe where the larger venues will hire entire buildings and divide each room to be rented out to several theater companies. "The Black Box Theatre" in Oslo, Norway, and the Alvina Krause Studio at Northwestern University are theaters of this type.

Technical features
Most older black boxes were built like television studios, with a low pipe grid overhead. Newer black boxes typically feature catwalks or tension grids, the latter combining the flexibility of the pipe grid with the accessibility of a catwalk.

The interiors of most black box theatres are painted black, although that is not exclusive (a black box doesn't have to be black to be considered a black box, though black is most common). The absence of colour not only gives the audience a sense of "anyplace"  (and thus allows flexibility from play to play or from scene to scene), it also allows for an innovative lighting design to shine through.

References

External links

Stagecraft
Parts of a theatre